The Las Cruces Ladies Open was a golf tournament on the LPGA Tour from 1964 to 1966. It was played at the Las Cruces Country Club in Las Cruces, New Mexico.

Winners
Las Cruces Ladies Open
1966 Kathy Whitworth

Las Cruces Open
1965 Clifford Ann Creed

Las Cruces Ladies' Open
1964 Sandra Haynie

References

Former LPGA Tour events
Golf in New Mexico
Las Cruces, New Mexico
History of women in New Mexico